Eucalyptus paliformis, commonly known as Wadbilliga ash, is a species of small to medium-sized tree that is endemic to a small area in southern New South Wales. It has smooth bark, lance-shaped to curved adult leaves, flower buds in groups of seven, white flowers and shortened spherical fruit.

Description
Eucalyptus paliformis is a tree that typically grows to a height of  but does not form a lignotuber. It has smooth greyish bark that is shed in ribbons to reveal yellow new bark. Flowering occurs from May to July and the flowers are white.

Taxonomy
Eucalyptus paliformis was first formally described in 1973 by Lawrie Johnson and Donald Blaxell from material they collected near the upper Tuross River in Wadbilliga National Park in 1971. The description was published in Contributions from the New South Wales Herbarium. The specific epithet (paliformis) is from Latin, meaning "stake-like", referring to the slim trunks of this eucalypt.

Distribution and habitat
Wadbilliga ash is only known from a single, pure stand in the Wadbilliga area near Cooma, where it grows in forest and woodland on a broad, high ridge.

References

paliformis
Myrtales of Australia
Flora of New South Wales
Trees of Australia
Plants described in 1973
Taxa named by Lawrence Alexander Sidney Johnson